The Black Sea Governorate was a province (guberniya) of the Caucasus Viceroyalty of the Russian Empire, established in 1896 on the territory of the  of the Kuban Oblast. The administrative center of the governorate was the Black Sea port of Novorossiysk. The governorate ceased to exist when the Black Sea Soviet Republic was established on its territory in the spring of 1918—later the governorate was incorporated into the Kuban-Black Sea Oblast of the Russian SFSR in March 1920.

Administrative divisions 
The districts (okrugs) of the Black Sea Governorate in 1917 were as follows:

Demographics

Russian Empire Census 
The plurality of the population indicated Russian to be their mother tongue, with significant Ukrainian, Armenian, and Greek speaking minorities.

Kavkazskiy kalendar 

Notes

References

Bibliography 

 
Caucasus Viceroyalty (1801–1917)
Governorates of the Caucasus
History of Kuban
States and territories established in 1896
States and territories disestablished in 1918
1896 establishments in the Russian Empire
1918 disestablishments in Russia